Charles Loewner (29 May 1893 – 8 January 1968) was an American mathematician. His name was Karel Löwner in Czech and Karl Löwner in German.

Karl Loewner was born into a Jewish family in Lany, about 30 km from Prague, where his father Sigmund Löwner was a store owner.

Loewner received his Ph.D. from the University of Prague in 1917 under supervision of Georg Pick.
One of his central mathematical contributions is the proof of the Bieberbach conjecture in the first highly nontrivial case of the third coefficient. The technique he introduced, the Loewner differential equation, has had far-reaching implications in geometric function theory; it was used in the final solution of the Bieberbach conjecture by Louis de Branges in 1985. Loewner worked at the University of Berlin, University of Prague, University of Louisville, Brown University, Syracuse University and eventually at Stanford University. His students include Lipman Bers, Roger Horn, Adriano Garsia, and P. M. Pu.

Loewner's torus inequality
In 1949 Loewner proved his torus inequality, to the effect that every metric on the 2-torus satisfies the optimal inequality

where sys is its systole.

Loewner matrix theorem
The Loewner matrix (in linear algebra) is a square matrix or, more specifically, a linear operator (of real  functions) associated with 2 input parameters consisting of (1) a real continuously differentiable function on a subinterval of the real numbers and (2) an -dimensional vector with elements chosen from the subinterval; the 2 input parameters are assigned an output parameter consisting of an  matrix.

Let  be a real-valued function that is continuously differentiable on the open interval .

.

See Operator monotone function.

Continuous groups
"During [Loewner's] 1955 visit to Berkeley he gave a course on continuous groups, and his lectures were reproduced in the form of duplicated notes. Loewner planned to write a detailed book on continuous groups based on these lecture notes, but the project was still in the formative stage at the time of his death." Harley Flanders and Murray H. Protter "decided to revise and correct the original lecture notes and make them available in permanent form." Charles Loewner: Theory of Continuous Groups (1971) was published by The MIT Press, and re-issued in 2008.

These linear transformations are Jacobians denoted  (page 41). The term invariant density is used for the Haar measure, which Loewner attributes to Adolph Hurwitz (page 46). Loewner proves that compact groups have equal left and right invariant densities (page 48).

A reviewer said, "The reader is helped by illuminating examples and comments on relations with analysis and geometry."

See also
 Löwner-John ellipsoid
 Schramm–Loewner evolution
 Loop-erased random walk
 Systoles of surfaces

References
Berger, Marcel: À l'ombre de Loewner. (French) Ann. Sci. École Norm. Sup. (4) 5 (1972), 241–260.
Loewner, Charles; Nirenberg, Louis: Partial differential equations invariant under conformal or projective transformations. Contributions to analysis (a collection of papers dedicated to Lipman Bers), pp. 245–272. Academic Press, New York, 1974.

External links
 Stanford memorial resolution 

1893 births
1968 deaths
20th-century American mathematicians
Czech mathematicians
Mathematical analysts
Jewish scientists
Stanford University Department of Mathematics faculty